Isola del Piano is a comune (municipality) in the Province of Pesaro e Urbino in the Italian region Marche, located about  west of Ancona and about  southwest of Pesaro.

Isola del Piano borders the following municipalities: Fossombrone, Montefelcino, Urbino.

References

Cities and towns in the Marche